Agalakote may refer to:

 Agalakote (Devanahalli)
 Agalakote (Magadi)
 Agalakote (Malur)
 Agalakote (Tumkur)